The 2002–03 season was West Bromwich Albion's first season in the Premier League, and their first season in the top division of English football since 1985–86.

Season summary 
West Brom finished the season in 19th position in the Premier League table, meaning that they were relegated back to the First Division. In other competitions, West Brom reached the fourth round of the FA Cup and the third round of the League Cup.

Danny Dichio was the top scorer for Albion with 8 goals in all competitions, while his five league goals saw him finish as joint top league scorer along with Scott Dobie.

Final league table

Premier League

FA Cup

League Cup

Players

First-team squad

Left club during season

Reserve squad

Statistics

Appearances and goals 

|-
! colspan=12 style=background:#dcdcdc; text-align:center| Goalkeepers

|-
! colspan=12 style=background:#dcdcdc; text-align:center| Defenders

|-
! colspan=12 style=background:#dcdcdc; text-align:center| Midfielders

|-
! colspan=12 style=background:#dcdcdc; text-align:center| Forwards

|}

Starting 11 
Considering starts in all competitions

See also 
West Bromwich Albion F.C. seasons

Notes

References 

West Bromwich Albion F.C. seasons
West Brom